Malcolm Glen Clegg (October 2, 1933 – May 20, 2016) was a civil servant and politician from Alberta, Canada. He served in the Legislative Assembly of Alberta from 1986 to 2001.

Political career
Clegg was first elected to the Alberta Legislature in the 1986 general election. He defeated incumbent New Democrat Jim Gurnett by less than two hundred votes to win the reconstituted riding of Dunvegan for the Progressive Conservatives.

In the 1989 general election Clegg defeated Gurnett again,  as well as Liberal candidate Gerald Eherer. In the 1993 general election he defeated Hartmann Nagel of the Liberals by just three hundred votes; the NDP finished a strong third.  His margin of victory was larger in the 1997 general election; Fred Trotter of the Liberals still made a strong showing but the Liberal vote was reduced over the last election. Clegg retired from the legislature when it was dissolved in 2001.

Later life
In 2002, Clegg was appointed to the Electoral Boundaries Commission. In 2004 he was appointed by Minister of Learning Lyle Oberg to the Northern Alberta Institute of Technology's board of directors as a representative of the Fairview area.

References

External links
Legislative Assembly of Alberta Members Listing

Progressive Conservative Association of Alberta MLAs
2016 deaths
1933 births